Russian Roulette is a 1976 self-produced album by English rock/pop group, the Hollies, and their 17th UK studio album. The album is the band's second release in 1976 (the other being Write On). It was composed entirely by the group's songwriting team. The album was not issued in the US (although five of the album's ten tracks appeared on Epic Records' release, "Clarke, Hicks, Sylvester, Calvert, Elliott", issued in the North American market in 1977).

The album is a combination of pop music, guitar rock and disco (plus the Latin-styled "Draggin' My Heels"). Although the songs were not a great success in the UK, the opening disco-funk track "Wiggle That Wotsit" became Top 20 hit in the New Zealand (No. 11). It also appeared in the Dutch charts (No. 23) and reached the Swedish Top 20 (No. 19). Another track "Daddy Don't Mind" reached No. 21 on the Dutch Top 40 and No. 36 in Germany (session musician Wally Smith from Ted Heath And His Music played a trumpet solo for its bridge section).

Recording sessions were held at the Basing Street Studios, located in London's Notting Hill district. Session musicians on the album included keyboard player Peter Arnesen (from The Rubettes), percussionist Chris Karan (The Dudley Moore Trio) and a brass section made up of Jimmy Jewell, Henry Lowther and John Mumford.

Famous British art group Hipgnosis designed the album cover for Russian Roulette.

Track listing
All songs composed by Allan Clarke, Tony Hicks and Terry Sylvester .

Side 1
"Wiggle That Wotsit"
"48 Hour Parole"
"Thanks For the Memories"
"My Love"
"Lady of the Night"

Side 2
"Russian Roulette"
"Draggin' My Heels"
"Louise"
"Be With You"
"Daddy Don't Mind"

Personnel
The Hollies
Allan Clarke — vocals, harmonica
Tony Hicks — lead guitar, banjo, vocals
Terry Sylvester — rhythm guitar, vocals
Bobby Elliott — drums
Bernie Calvert — bass guitar

Additional musicians and production
Peter Arnesen – keyboards
Chris Karan – percussion on "48 Hour Parole" and "Draggin' My Heels"
Jimmy Jewell – alto and tenor saxophone on "Wiggle That Wotsit", "Lady Of The Night" and "Louise"
Henry Lowther – trumpet on "Wiggle That Wotsit" and "48 Hour Parole"
John Mumford – trombone on "Wiggle That Wotsit"
Wally Smith – trombone on "Daddy Don't Mind"
Phill Brown, Rhett Davies – engineers

References

1976 albums
The Hollies albums
Polydor Records albums
Albums with cover art by Hipgnosis